Alcis taiwanovariegata is a moth of the  family Geometridae. It is found in Taiwan.

Taxonomy
The species was described in the genus Boarmia and was subsequently treated as a subspecies of Alcis variegata.

References

Moths described in 1917
Boarmiini
Moths of Taiwan